, son of Mototsugu, was a kugyō or Japanese court noble of the Muromachi period (1336–1573). He held a regent position kampaku from 1361 to 1363. Kanetsugu was his son.

References

Fujiwara clan
Konoe family
1333 births
1387 deaths